Baltaşı is a village in the Palu District of Elazığ Province in Turkey. Its population is 1,113 (2021). Before the 2013 reorganisation, it was a town (belde).

References

Villages in Palu District